The Charleston Rockets were a professional American football team based in Charleston, West Virginia. They began play in 1964 as a member of the United Football League, and became a charter franchise in the Continental Football League in 1965. In their first season in the COFL, the Rockets finished with a perfect 14–0 record and won the league championship over the Toronto Rifles, 24–7. After an ownership change in 1968, the team announced that it was suspending operations in January 1969. Its place in the league's lineup was replaced by the Jersey Jays, returning the CFL to North Jersey after the departure of the Newark Bears to Orlando three seasons prior.

Season-by-season

References

American football teams in West Virginia
Continental Football League teams
1964 establishments in West Virginia
1969 disestablishments in West Virginia